David Andrés Reyes Ferrada (born 17 January 1985) is a Chilean footballer. His currently club is Chilean Segunda División side San Antonio Unido.

Honours

Player
San Luis de Quillota
 Primera B (1): 2014 Clausura

External links
 Profile at BDFA
 

1985 births
Living people
People from San Antonio, Chile
People from San Antonio Province
People from Valparaíso Region
Chilean footballers
Municipal Limache footballers
Santiago Wanderers footballers
Coquimbo Unido footballers
Deportes Temuco footballers
San Luis de Quillota footballers
San Antonio Unido footballers
Chilean Primera División players
Primera B de Chile players
Segunda División Profesional de Chile players
Association football goalkeepers
21st-century Chilean people